Doodles was an activity comic strip written and illustrated by Christopher Foote. Syndicated from.1985 until October 17, 2021, following Foote's death in July 2021, the comic was distributed by Creators Syndicate.

Overview 
The strip features four animal characters who entertain readers with a variety of activities, including: mazes, puzzles, jokes, puns, and riddles.  Among the Doodles helpers are: Bosco, a lovable and inquisitive koala; Toby, a fun-loving hippo; Zak, a sarcastic but goofy giraffe, and Steve, a curious ape.

Readers are invited to send in their favorite jokes to the Doodles strip for inclusion in the weekly comic via mail or through the strip's web page: https://www.creators.com/read/doodles

External links 
 Doodles comics on Creators.com- updated daily

Comics about animals
American comic strips
1985 comics debuts
2021 comics endings